Cercosaura hypnoides is a species of lizard in the family Gymnophthalmidae. It is endemic to Colombia.

References

Cercosaura
Reptiles of Colombia
Endemic fauna of Colombia
Reptiles described in 2012
Taxa named by Tiffany M. Doan
Taxa named by William W. Lamar